The Border Patrolman is a 1936 American Western film directed by David Howard and starring George O'Brien.

Plot 
Spoiled socialite Patricia Huntley gets arrested by U.S. Border Patrol agent Bob Wallace in Arizona after meeting with jewel smuggler Courtney Haybrook four miles from the U.S.-Mexico border. She defiantly smokes, tears up the citation, and claims he manhandled her when taken to the station. However, when he quits after being forced to apologize to her she becomes guilty and convinces her wealthy grandfather Frank Adams to hire him at a new job.

At Bob's advice, Frank hires him as Pat's tutor, teaching her riding and swimming. They initially bond, but she becomes upset after learning of her grandfather's plan. She tries to get drunk to embarrass him, only to find that the hotel staff have been ordered by Bob not to serve her any more drinks. After Pat slaps Bob, he decides to quit and she decides to go south of the border to marry Courtney, who hides a valuable stolen necklace in her purse. At the last moment she decides to not to marry Courtney and leaves with Pat. After they are captured, Bob rescues Pat again and they reconcile.

Cast
 George O'Brien as Bob Wallace
 Polly Ann Young as Patricia Huntley
 Smiley Burnette as Chuck Owens
 LeRoy Mason as Courtney Haybrook
 Mary Doran as Myra
 Al Hill as Frank Adams
 William P. Carleton as Jeremiah Huntley
 Tom London as Johnson
 Frank Campeau as Capt. Stevens
 Charles Coleman as Collins, a Servant
 Fay McKenzie (uncredited)
 Lester Dorr as Garage Attendant (uncredited)
 Martin Garralaga as Carlos, the Cantina Proprietor (uncredited)
 Lloyd Ingraham as Man at Swimming Pool (uncredited)
 George MacQuarrie as Jim Riker (uncredited)
 Chris-Pin Martin as Mexican Giving Directions (uncredited)
 Gertrude Messinger as Telephone Operator (uncredited)
 Cyril Ring as Ed Hendricks (uncredited)
 John St. Polis as Manning (uncredited)

External links
 
 
 

1936 films
1936 Western (genre) films
American black-and-white films
Films directed by David Howard
American Western (genre) films
20th Century Fox films
Films set in Arizona
Films set in Mexico
1930s English-language films
1930s American films